Wang Chengbin (born 15 January 1928) is a lieutenant general (zhongjiang) of the People's Liberation Army (PLA). He was a member of the 13th and 14th Central Committee of the Chinese Communist Party.

Biography
Wang was born in Ye County (now Laizhou), Shandong, on 15 January 1928. 

He enlisted in the Eighth Route Army in August 1944, and joined the Chinese Communist Party (CCP) in October 1945. During the Second Sino-Japanese War, he resisted the Imperial Japanese Army in Jiaodong Military District. During the Chinese Civil War, he belonged to the 38th Division of the 13th Column of the East China Field Army and engaged in the Jinan campaign, Huaihai campaign, Yangtze River Crossing campaign, Shanghai Campaign, and Fuzhou campaign.

After the establishment of the Communist State in 1951, he served in the 31st Group Army, where he eventually rose to become deputy commander in 1970. He was president of Nanchang Army School in 1983, and held that office until 1985. In June 1985, he was appointed deputy commander of the Nanjing Military Region, he remained in that position until April 1990, when he was transferred to the Beijing Military Region and promoted to commander. He attained the rank of lieutenant general (zhongjiang) in 1988.

Personal life 
His daughter Wang Qiuyang (born 1967) is a mountaineer and businesswoman, and his son-in-law Zhang Baoquan (born 1957) is a businessman and real estate tycoon.

References

1928 births
Living people
People from Laizhou
Commanders of the Beijing Military Region
People's Liberation Army generals from Shandong
People's Republic of China politicians from Shandong
Chinese Communist Party politicians from Shandong
Members of the 13th Central Committee of the Chinese Communist Party
Members of the 14th Central Committee of the Chinese Communist Party